Nadjim Manseur (born June 8, 1988 in Béjaïa) is an Algerian middle distance runner, who specialized in the 800 metres. In 2008, he set his personal best time of 1:44.75, by finishing fourth at the sixth meet of AF Golden League in Rome, Italy.

Manseur represented Algeria at the 2008 Summer Olympics in Beijing, where he competed for the men's 800 metres, along with his compatriot Nabil Madi. He finished eighth in the final round of this event by more than a second behind Madi, outside his personal best of 1:47.19.

References

External links

NBC 2008 Olympics profile

Algerian male middle-distance runners
Living people
Olympic athletes of Algeria
Athletes (track and field) at the 2008 Summer Olympics
Sportspeople from Béjaïa
1988 births
21st-century Algerian people
20th-century Algerian people